ZNP may refer to:

K-Class (ZNP-K)
Zanzibar Nationalist Party
Zinc pyrithione
Zion National Park
Zoram Nationalist Party
Związek Nauczycielstwa Polskiego (Polish Teachers' Union)